Universe is the first EP by Canadian artist Sarah Slean.

Track listing
 "Weight"
 "I Know"
 "Angel"
 "Me and Jerome"
 "Universe"
 "Pie Jesu"

CD release hidden tracks
 "John XXIII" (hidden track)
 "Climbing up the Walls" (Radiohead cover from OK Computer) (hidden track)

Personnel
 Sarah Slean – piano, vocals
 Sharon Tiessen – cello
 Christine Paul – violin
 Mark Mariash – drums, percussion
 Michael Cooper – basses, keyboard bass
 Chris Emmink – electric guitar noises

1998 debut EPs
Sarah Slean albums